Johanna Elisabeth Anna Maria "Jopie" Nooren (born 25 June 1961) is a Dutch occupational therapist, university professor, and politician. She is a member of the Labour Party and was a member of the Senate between 9 June 2015 and 1 March 2021.

In March 2021 Dr Jopie Nooren was appointed Chair of the Executive Board of the Amsterdam University of Applied Sciences .

References

External links 
 Jopie Nooren (in Dutch) at the Labour Party website
 Jopie Nooren (in Dutch) at the Senate website

1961 births
Living people
21st-century Dutch politicians
Dutch women in politics
Labour Party (Netherlands) politicians
Members of the Senate (Netherlands)
 Occupational therapists
People from Breda